Phrased Differently is an independent music publishing, production and artist development company founded in 2006, by former Universal Records executive and songwriter Hiten Bharadia. Their offices in Shoreditch, East London, are also home to seven underground recording studios, which are occupied by their signed writers including Bharadia, Philippe-Marc Anquetil, Knightstarr, Andreas Moe, Nathan Duvall (Disciples), Maegan Cottone, Michael Stockwell, Raphaella, Sky Adams, Commands, Mark Vallance, Dimitri Elrlich, and Phoebe Jo Brown. The company has managed over 1000 song placements since its inception, including 81 No. 1's, 306 Top 10 records, 30 Platinum Records and 31 Gold records around the world. To date, they have worked with artists such as Calvin Harris, Miley Cyrus, Jessie J, Iggy Azalea, Britney Spears, Olly Murs, Demi Lovato, Selena Gomez, Robin Schulz, Hardwell, Fleur East, Gorgen City, Omi, Miss Montreal, Tinie Tempah, Little Mix, Craig David, Lemar, Kelly Rowland, The Overtones, Lawson, Afrojack, You Me At Six, Allstar Weekend, Kumi Koda, Nora Van Elken, Toho Shinki, Sarah Connor, Namie Amuro, Cover Drive, Shinee, Avicii, John De Sohn and Tiesto. In 2011, Phrased Differently won its first BMI Pop Award for over 200,000 US radio spins on Miley Cyrus' "Can't Be Tamed".

Signed writers
 Sky Adams
 Philippe-Marc Anquetil
 Hiten Bharadia
 Bhavik Pattani
 David Bjork
 Phoebe Jo Brown
 Commands
 Maegan Cottone
 DASA
 Nathan Duvall
 Dimitri Ehrlich
 Ki Fitzgerald
 Justin Jesso
 Knightstarr
 Lawrie Martin
 Sam Merifield
 Andreas Moe
 Raphaella
 Jordan Shaw
 Will Simms
 Michael Stockwell
 Tali Kouchner
 Hannah Wilson
 Mark Vallance

International releases

Singles

Albums

References

External links 
 Official website

Music publishing companies of the United Kingdom